Pokkiri Raja is a 2010 Indian Malayalam-language action comedy film written by the duo Udaykrishna–Sibi K. Thomas, directed by debutante Vysakh and starring Mammootty and Prithviraj Sukumaran with the supporting cast including Shriya Saran, Siddique, Nedumudi Venu, Vijayaraghavan, Salim Kumar, Suraj Venjaramoodu and Riyaz Khan. The score was composed by C. Rajamani with songs composed by Jassie Gift. The film received positive response from the critics and audience and was a box office success. The film marked the debut of Shriya Saran in Malayalam cinema.

The film was released on 7 May 2010 worldwide. It was remade in Hindi as Boss & Telugu film Bhai was loosely based on this film. The film was dubbed and released in Tamil as Raja Pokkiri Raja. A spin-off named Madhura Raja released on 12 April 2019. The film was a major commercial success and was the highest grossing Malayalam film of the year.

Plot
Kunnath Madhavan Nair lives happily with his two sons Raja and Surya Narayanan. However, their happiness is short-lived when Raja is arrested for killing a boy belonging to their opposite family, but is also revealed that the murder was mistakenly committed by Madhavan himself, but Raja had taken the blame. Even after Raja comes out of prison, Madhavan refuses to accept him not knowing about his innocence. Raja leaves for  Madurai, where he saves the son of the village landlord named Maniannan. Due to this, Raja turns into his right hand and was named as Madurai Raja.

Years later, a grown Raja becomes a fearsome kingpin named called Pokkiri Raja, while Surya is now an energetic, educated and well known for his fights in the village. To change his character, Surya is sent to Ernakulam to his brother-in-law S.I. Sugunan, who is fearful. At Ernakulam, Surya falls in love with Aswathy, the daughter of city police commissioner Rajendranath Babu. Sugunan takes advantage of Surya's character and sends him in his uniform to take care of some severe police cases. Meanwhile, Surya follows Ashwathy, but is unknown to the fact that Home Minister's son Mahendran is also behind her.

Aswathy shows hatred for Surya, thinking he is a cop, but she tells him that Rajendra Babu is not her real father but her step-father, who had killed her mother and have left her alive because Mahendran was having a liking to her. Rajendra and Mahendran learns of Surya's and Aswathy's relationship and arrests him for false charges of smuggling narcotics. The duo also plan to kill Surya and gives the contract to Raja. At this point, Madhavan leaves for Madurai in search of Raja and asks for his help to rescue Surya. After realizing that Surya is his brother, Raja rescues Surya and warns Rajendra. After many hurdles, Raja defeats Rajendra and Mahendran, but spares them and Surya reunites with Aswathy.

Cast
 
 Mammootty as  Raja / Madhura Raja
 Prithviraj Sukumaran as  Surya Narayanan
 Shriya Saran as Aswathy (voiceover by Sreeja Ravi)
 Nedumudi Venu as Kunnath Madhavan Nair, Raja and Surya's father
 Vijayaraghavan as Kunnath Krishnan
 Siddique as City Police Commissioner Rajendra Babu IPS
 Riyaz Khan as Mahendran, Aswathy's Fiancé and Kumaran's son
 Suraj Venjaramoodu as SI 'Idivettu' Sugunan 
 Salim Kumar as Novelist Manoharan Mangalodayam
 Charan Raj as Maniyannan
 Bindu Panicker as Rugmini, 'Idivettu' Suganan's wife, and Raja and Surya's sister
 Thesni Khan as Ramani, Manoharan's wife
 Ambika Mohan as Lathika, Raja's and Surya's mother
 Delhi Ganesh as Velu, Raja's assistant 
 Santhosh Jogi as Sathya, Raja'a assistant
 Rizabawa as Home Minister Kumaran 
 Ponnamma Babu as Home Minister's wife
 Anil Murali as CI Dinesh Menon
 Sadiq as SI Raveendranath 
 Urmila Unni as Aswathy's Mother
 Arun as Varun
 Kalabhavan Shajohn as SI Thomas
 Joemon Joshy as Gopi
 Jagannatha Varma as Thirumeni
 Kozhikode Narayanan Nair as Poojari Narayanan
 T. P. Madhavan as Shivankutty, Temple Committee Member 
 Dhandapani as Parthasarathy
 Abu Salim as Quotation Vasu
 Kalashala Babu as Achuthan Nair
 Kundara Johny as Chandrashekharan, Achuthan's son
 Santhosh as Divakaran, Achuthan's son 
 Paravai Muniyamma
 Karate Raja as Raja's assistant
 Baburaj as Unnithan
 Baiju Ezhupunna as Chandru
 Kanya Bharathi as Malini, Rajendra Babu's wife
 Sasi Kalinga as Police officer Rakesh Tiwari 
 Shweta Menon in a guest appearance in a song Manikyakallin
 Rachana Maurya as a bar dancer (Cameo appearance in the item song "Chenthengil Ponnilaneeru")

Production
The film was launched by Mammootty with the absence of Prithviraj and Shriya Saran at Changanassery on 30 December 2009. Veteran director Joshiy lighted the ceremonial lamp at the function. Shooting of the film began on 11 January 2010 at various locations in Pollachi and Ernakulam. Prithviraj's song 'Manikyakallin Mukkuticharhtum' song was first shot. The shooting completed within 50 days with a production cost around 5 crores and distribution works started in April. Audio was launched in April at Ernakulam. The dubbing of the film was happen at Kochi. A song was planned to shoot at London featuring the lead pair Prithviraj and Shriya Saran but had to canceled because of volcanic ash from london has stopped the airport from fly in or out any flight. While actress Shriya Saran get stranded with Tamil actor Arya at London while shooting for their film Chikku Bukku.

Release
The film got released in 110 screens in India, with 90 of it in Kerala. It was later remade into Hindi as Boss starring Akshay Kumar.

Reception

Box office
The film was made on a budget of ₹10 crore. The film collected around ₹16 crore and was successful at the UAE box office. The film was major commercial success, and highest grossing Malayalam film of the year 2010. The film ran 175 days in theatres.

Critical response 
Indiaglitz.com reviewed it as a "masala fiesta" and commented that the cinematography and editing are the main highlights of the film, also said "Vysakh as a debutant director has made a decent entertainer and the young man is definitely destined to go places in mainstream Malayalam cinema". Paresh C. Palicha of Rediff.com onelined as "Pokkiriraja disappoints" and rated 2/5 stars, he criticize the script does not care for logic or storytelling. But Prithviraj packaged as a wholesome entertainer does not disappoint. And concluded "Pokkiriraja may supposedly achieve the super hit status with the help of the fans. But, for the genuine viewer, it is a disappointment". Sify.com called it "mass masala" and commented as it doesn't have a decent storyline but appreciating the visuals. And said the writers have succeeded in allotting equal importance to both the lead actors. But criticized the lack of logic in the script. Veeyen of Nowrunning.com rated 2/5 stars and heavily criticized the script saying "I just have one simple question to ask. Is it too much to ask for a simple, good story in films?", also said "Pokkiri Raja" is like a fusion of Tamil and Telugu cinema, but sadly of the 80's. Gayathry V. Pillai of One India stated "The movie is somewhat similar to a Tamil film with lots of actions, songs and punch dialogues" and called it a "mass masala entertainer", and criticized the length.

Music
The music is composed by Jassie Gift and Theme music by Rajamani. The album contains 6 songs. The songs will be featured throughout the film except the other version of Ketile Kettile song. Kaithapram contributed the lyrics. This audio was released on 8 April 2010.

Spin-off
A spin-off named Madhura Raja was released on 12 April 2019, which grossed over ₹125 crore at the box office. The third one of the Raja series has been announced and titled as Minister Raja.

References

External links 
 
 

2010 action films
2010 directorial debut films
2010 films
2010 masala films
2010s Malayalam-language films
Films directed by Vysakh
Films scored by Jassie Gift
Films set in Bangalore
Films set in Bangladesh
Films set in Karnataka
Films set in Kerala
Films set in Tamil Nadu
Films shot in Bangalore
Films shot in Karnataka
Films shot in Kochi
Films shot in Pollachi
Films shot in Thiruvananthapuram
Films shot in Uttar Pradesh
Films with screenplays by Udayakrishna-Siby K. Thomas
Indian action films
Malayalam films remade in other languages